Peruvazhiyambalam is a 1979 Indian Malayalam-language crime drama film written and directed by P. Padmarajan, based on his novel of the same name. The film was Padmarajan's directorial debut and the acting debut of Ashokan, who played the central character, Raman. The film is an incisive examination of how violence or totalitarianism works in our society; it dealt with disturbing questions relating to masculinity and how people adore and dread it at the same time. It was one of the last black-and-white Malayalam films.

The Hindu described this film as one of the finest films in Malayalam. It won the National Film Award for Best Feature Film in Malayalam. The film was included in IBN Live's list of 100 greatest Indian films of all time.

Plot 

Fifteen-year-old Raman lives alone with his older sister Bhagyam, their parents having died several years prior. The town bully Prabhakaran Pillai is killed by Raman. He escapes from murder charges by hiding from the police with the help of a teashop owner Viswambharan and a prostitute.

Cast 
Ashokan as Raman/Mani
Bharat Gopy as Viswambharan
Jose Prakash as Paramu Nair
Sukumari as Paramu Nair's wife
K. P. A. C. Azeez as  Prabhakaran Pillai
 Santhakumari as Prabhakaran Pillai's wife
K P A C Lalitha as Kunnumpurath Devayani, the prostitute
Krishnan Kutty Nair as Vaidhyan
Valsala Premdevdas
Chandrika
Santhosh Kumar
Muthukulam K.G.
Giri
George Joseph
A.N. Nair
V.T. Thomas
Rathi
Bobby
Madhavikutty

Accolades 
National Film Awards
 Best Feature Film in Malayalam

Kerala State Film Awards
 Second Best Film
 Best Story – Padmarajan

References

External links 
 

1970s Malayalam-language films
1979 crime drama films
1979 directorial debut films
1979 films
Best Malayalam Feature Film National Film Award winners
Films based on Indian novels
Films directed by Padmarajan
Films with screenplays by Padmarajan
Indian crime drama films